97.7 Win Radio (DXSR 97.7 MHz) is an FM station owned by Sarraga Integrated and Management Corporation and operated by ZimZam Management. Its studios and transmitter are located at the 2nd Floor, Arlyn Bldg., Guinoyuran Rd., Brgy. Poblacion, Valencia, Bukidnon.

The station was formerly operated by AR Broadcast Media under the brand Power News FM from 2018 to 2021. Back then, it was located in Purok 13, Brgy. Hagkol. In April 2021, RSV Broadcast Services acquired the airtime of its former repeater in Malaybalay, currently broadcasting as Radyo Agong.

References

Radio stations in Bukidnon
Radio stations established in 2018